Neltje, also known as Neltje Doubleday Kings (October 10, 1934April 30, 2021), was an American artist, businesswoman and philanthropist. In 2005 Neltje received the Wyoming Governor's Art Award for her artwork; she was an abstract painter.

She has also created a variety of awards and programs to encourage writing and the arts, including the Neltje Blanchan Literary Award and the Jentel Foundation, which supports artists' residencies at her ranch in Banner, Wyoming.

In 2010, Neltje made an estate gift to the University of Wyoming, which it says is the largest in its history.  It consists of her ranch, studio, art collection, and financial holdings. When the gift is realized, the university will base the UW Neltje Center for the Visual and Literary Arts at her ranch, creating a center for collaboration among three university departments.

Early life and education
Born Neltje Doubleday in 1934, she is the daughter of Ellen McCarter and Nelson Doubleday, and has an older brother Nelson Doubleday, Jr.  The siblings were born in New York City; they grew up in Oyster Bay, Long Island. The family also spent time in South Carolina.  Nelson and Neltje attended private schools.

Their paternal grandparents were Neltje Blanchan De Graff and Frank N. Doubleday; their grandfather was the founder of the United States Doubleday publishing company. Their grandmother wrote books on gardens and birds. Their maternal grandfather Thomas McCarter was head of the New Jersey Public Service Commission and a benefactor of Princeton University.

Marriage and family
In May 1953 at the age of 18, Neltje married John Turner Sargent, Sr., then 28 and already working at the Doubleday Company. They had a daughter Ellen and son John Turner Sargent, Jr.  Sargent was promoted to leadership positions at Doubleday, where he later served as president and chairman.

After the couple divorced in 1965, Neltje moved with her young children to Wyoming. They also continued to see their father in New York. She started to draw at the age of 30 and became increasingly involved in making art.

By 1967, she married a Mr. Kings, an artist; they divorced after six years. Some years later, Neltje dropped her surnames, legally using only one name: Neltje.

Neltje Doubleday Kings died Friday, April 30, 2021 in Banner, Wyoming.

Career
Neltje Doubleday left New York and moved to Banner, Wyoming, where in 1966 she bought a 440-acre ranch on Lower Piney Creek. She has since added to the property for cattle ranching and hay production. She operated the working ranch in part for preservation of historic and land resources; the original stone house was built soon after the Spanish–American War.  There she has gradually built her art career, learning to paint and working in a variety of materials, including sculpting.

In 1967, the heiress bought the Sheridan Inn in Sheridan, Wyoming to save it from destruction; the property was a National Historic Landmark that had been condemned because of deterioration.  She renovated parts of it, and in 1968, "re-opened the Inn’s saloon, which was followed a year later by the re-opening of the dining room, the Ladies Parlor and the Wyoming Room, an all new addition to the Inn." It was renewed as part of community life of the city. She owned and operated it for 18 years. Working in every aspect of its operations, she also added a gift shop and art gallery to the hotel interior. The inn has been owned since 1990 by the Sheridan Heritage Center, Inc.

In her art, Neltje has concentrated on painting abstract works. She is represented by galleries and her work is held in numerous private collections and museums, including the Smithsonian Institution; Wyoming State Museum, Cheyenne; and Yellowstone Art Museum, Billings, Montana.

She is the author of the 2016 memoir, North of Crazy (9781250088147).

Philanthropy, legacy, and honors
In addition to creating her own artwork, Neltje has endowed and organized programs to encourage other artists and writers. As the leader of the Wyoming Arts Council, from 1985 to 1988, she established and endowed the Neltje Blanchan literary award, named in honor of her paternal grandmother, who used this pen name as an author of books about gardens and birds. In January 2001 she created the private Jentel Foundation, to support and manage artists' residencies at her ranch in Banner. Following the first pilot residencies of writers in 2001, the foundation had undertaken both renovation of existing buildings and new construction to create additional facilities to support the Jentel program. The program has expanded to admit artists and writers for short-stay residencies which run eleven months of the year.  Applications are taken twice a year.  In 2005 she received the Wyoming Governor's Art Award. She has also received an honorary degree from Rocky Mountain College in Billings, Montana.

References

External links
"Neltje", Official Website
Jentel Artist Residency Program, Official Website

1934 births
2021 deaths
American abstract artists
American women painters
Artists from Wyoming
Artists from New York City
Philanthropists from New York (state)
21st-century American women artists